Daniel Little McFadden (born July 29, 1937) is an American econometrician who shared the 2000 Nobel Memorial Prize in Economic Sciences with James Heckman. McFadden's share of the prize was "for his development of theory and methods for analyzing discrete choice". He is the Presidential Professor of Health Economics at the University of Southern California and Professor of the Graduate School at University of California, Berkeley.

Early life and education
McFadden was born on July 29, 1937 in Raleigh, North Carolina. He attended the University of Minnesota, where he received a B.S. in Physics, and a Ph.D. in Behavioral Science (Economics) five years later (1962). While at the University of Minnesota, his graduate advisor was Leonid Hurwicz, who was awarded the Economics Nobel Prize in 2007.

Career
In 1964 McFadden joined the faculty of University of California, Berkeley, focusing his research on choice behavior and the problem of linking economic theory and measurement. In 1974 he introduced Conditional logit analysis.
 
In 1975 McFadden won the John Bates Clark Medal. In 1977 he moved to the Massachusetts Institute of Technology. In 1981 he was elected to the National Academy of Sciences.

He returned to Berkeley in 1991, founding the Econometrics Laboratory, which is devoted to statistical computation for economics applications. He remains its director. He is a trustee of the Economists for Peace and Security. In 2000 he won the Erwin Plein Nemmers Prize in Economics and was elected to the American Philosophical Society in 2006.

In January 2011 McFadden was appointed the Presidential Professor of Health Economics at the University of Southern California (USC), which entails a joint appointment in the Department of Economics and the Price School of Public Policy.

See also
 List of economists

References

External links
 Daniel McFadden's homepage
  includes the Prize Lecture 8 december 2000 Economic Choices
 2000 Nemmers Prize in Economics
 
 IDEAS/RePEc

1937 births
Living people
Members of the United States National Academy of Sciences
Econometricians
Health economists
Economists from North Carolina
American Nobel laureates
Nobel laureates in Economics
University of Minnesota College of Science and Engineering alumni
University of California, Berkeley faculty
Massachusetts Institute of Technology School of Science faculty
University of Southern California faculty
People from Raleigh, North Carolina
20th-century American economists
21st-century American economists
Fellows of the Econometric Society
Presidents of the Econometric Society
Earhart Foundation Fellows
Presidents of the American Economic Association
Distinguished Fellows of the American Economic Association
National Bureau of Economic Research
Members of the American Philosophical Society